Julio Henri (11 March 1933 – 5 June 2016) was an Argentine equestrian. He competed in two events at the 1964 Summer Olympics.

References

External links
 

1933 births
2016 deaths
Argentine male equestrians
Olympic equestrians of Argentina
Equestrians at the 1964 Summer Olympics
Place of birth missing